Mount Oliver can refer to:

 Mount Oliver, Pennsylvania, a borough
 Mount Oliver (Pittsburgh), a neighborhood (outside of the borough)
 Mount Oliver in the Prince Olav Mountains of Antarctica
 Mount Oliver (Alberta) in the Canadian Rockies

See also
 Mount John Oliver, British Columbia, Canada